Dallas Toler-Wade (born June 6, 1974) is an American musician, best known for his work in the ancient Egyptian-themed technical death metal band Nile. He is currently the guitarist, lead vocalist and primary songwriter of the metal band Narcotic Wasteland.

Biography
Toler-Wade started playing the drums at seven-years old. At the age of fourteen, he started learning to play the guitar. His career started as a drummer for the Greenville, South Carolina-based technical death metal band Lecherous Nocturne. During his tenure there, he was recommended to Karl Sanders of Nile and subsequently joined the band in September 1997 as a guitarist and vocalist. He left the band in October 2016. Nile announced the departure in February 2017.

Toler-Wade started Narcotic Wasteland as a side project in 2014, but it became his full-time project once he left Nile in 2016. Narcotic Wasteland has released two albums. The first album is self-titled and the second is titled Delirium Tremens. Both albums were released through Megaforce Records. Narcotic Wasteland is signed with the talent agency Ashley Talent International, LLC.

Instrumentation 
 Dean V
 Dean ML
 Dean Razorback
 B.C. Rich Ironbird
 Marshall JCM2000 DSL100 amplifiers
 Marshall 1960 columns
 Seymour Duncan SH-8 Invader
SIT STRINGS custom gauge (13, 17, 26w, 36w, 46w, 70w)

Discography 

Nile

Black Seeds of Vengeance (2000, Relapse Records)
In Their Darkened Shrines (2002, Relapse Records)
Annihilation of the Wicked (2005, Relapse Records)
Ithyphallic (2007, Nuclear Blast)
Those Whom the Gods Detest (2009, Nuclear Blast)
At the Gate of Sethu (2012, Nuclear Blast)
What Should Not Be Unearthed (2015, Nuclear Blast)

Narcotic Wasteland
Narcotic Wasteland (2014; Reissued 2017, Megaforce Records)
Delirium Tremens (2017, Megaforce Records)

Others
Karl Sanders – Saurian Meditation (2004, Relapse Records, featuring)
Lecherous Nocturne – Adoration of the Blade (2006, Deepsend Records)
George Kollias – Invictus (2015, Season of Mist, featuring)

References 

1974 births
Living people
Lead guitarists
American heavy metal guitarists
American heavy metal singers
Death metal musicians
American multi-instrumentalists
American male guitarists
21st-century American male singers
21st-century American singers
21st-century American guitarists
Thrash metal musicians